Pattikonda is a Town and  mandal head quarter in Kurnool district of Andhra Pradesh, India. It is located in Adoni revenue division of Kurnool district. It is located 80 km away from Kurnool,  35 km from Adoni town and 35 km from Guntakal Town.

Pattikonda Assembly segment consists of 5 Mandals. viz., Pattikonda, Maddikera, Tuggali, Veldurthi, Krishnagiri mandals. In 2019 General elections Kangati Sridevi won the election from Pattikonda.

It has an average elevation of 465 meters (1528 feet).

References

Geography of Kurnool district